"Love Is on the Radio" is a song by the English pop rock band McFly, released on 24 November 2013 as the lead single from their since shelved sixth studio album.

Alternative versions of the song were released on the same day, including the Silent Aggression Mix, McBusted Mix and Hopeful Live Mix, while the Me & Mrs F Mix was released on 26 November. The McBusted mix was the first release by Busted in nine years and version was available to pre-order alongside McBusted Tour tickets, as well as on iTunes. The demo version of "Love Is on the Radio" was available to buy with a CD bundle.

Track listings

Charts

Release history

References

External links
 

2013 singles
2013 songs
McFly songs
Songs written by Danny Jones
Songs written by James Bourne
Songs written by Tom Fletcher